SilverFin is the first novel in the Young Bond series that depicts Ian Fleming's superspy James Bond as a teenager in the 1930s. It was written by Charlie Higson and released in the United Kingdom on March 3, 2005 by Puffin Books in conjunction with a large marketing campaign; a Canadian release of the same edition occurred in late March. The United States edition, which was slightly edited for content, was released on April 27, 2005 by Miramax Books.

SilverFins success spawned a mobile game published by PlayerOne on January 5, 2006 in conjunction with the release of the second novel in the Young Bond series, Blood Fever. The game features three locations, 15 levels, and a variety of enemies that the player must avoid.

Because Fleming never explicitly said when James Bond was born, Ian Fleming Publications and Charlie Higson chose the year 1920 as his birth year. SilverFin takes place in 1933.

Plot summary
SilverFin is broken up into three parts in addition to a prologue. In the prologue, an unnamed school boy is attacked by eels, attracted to a bleeding fishhook cut, while fishing in Loch Silverfin. Then from nowhere a mysterious eel-like man runs and jumps into the loch and tries to save him.

The first part of the book chronicles James Bond's starting attendance at Eton College, an elite  English boarding school. There he meets Pritpal, the son of an Indian Maharajah. The two become good friends and live together in the dorms along with another of his friends, a Chinese boy named Tommy Chong. Bond also comes into contact with George Hellebore, an American bully three years older than James. George's father, Lord Randolph Hellebore is an armament dealer who sold weapons to various countries after World War I. It is later revealed that Lord Hellebore knew Bond's father, Andrew Bond, who also sold arms while working for Vickers after the war. Lord Hellebore arrives at Eton to direct and host a tournament cup ("Hellebore Cup") for the boys. The competition is divided into three events: shooting, swimming, and running, It is rumoured that George Hellebore is supposed to win, but an unexpected rival named Andrew Carlton manages to beat him. Bond places seventh in shooting, fourth in his heat in swimming (which was not good enough to qualify for the final race), and first in cross country running. During the running sequence Lord Hellebore attempts to help his son cheat so that he could win the tournament; however, Bond after seeing George take a shortcut a first time decides to follow George the next time, and being the superior runner then passes him to win the race. George tries to trip James with his leg but loses his balance and falls into a mud puddle. Because Bond won first in running, Andrew Carlton is the winner and George Hellebore came in third place in the cup overall, which was unacceptable by his father's standard.

The second part of the novel details the spring break. James travels to Scotland to meet with his Aunt Charmian who is visiting Bond's ailing uncle, Max, who is dying of cancer. Both Charmian and Max are siblings of Bond's father, Andrew. It is also in this part of the novel that Higson reveals the details of Bond's parents' death, first mentioned in Ian Fleming's You Only Live Twice. While travelling to Scotland, Bond befriends an older boy named "Red"(for his bright red hair) Kelly who is travelling to the same place in search for his missing cousin, Alfie who disappeared whilst out fishing (thus tying in with the prologue). James also meets a girl called Wilder who loves riding horses. While staying at his uncle's place Bond learns how to drive his uncle's car and finds out that his uncle was a spy during World War I. Bond also learns that Lord Randolph Hellebore owns a large stretch of land nearby that includes Loch Silverfin. He later meets back up with Red and ventures to Hellebore's estate where the two encounter Mike "Meatpacker" Moran, a Pinkerton's detective from New York City sent to investigate Lord Randolph Hellebore at the behest of Hellebore's wife, who suspects Lord Randolph of having killed his brother, her lover, Algar. However, they later discover the detective dead and eaten in Loch Silverfin, which is full of eels.

The boys plan to infiltrate the castle by climbing a tree, but Red falls out of the tree and breaks his leg, and is unable to continue. James succeeds in entering the castle. After snooping around he bumps his head and is captured. When James regains consciousness he is tied to a table and Lord Hellebore begins to interrogate him. Hellebore explains to James that he and his brother set out to create better and stronger soldiers by manipulating the endocrine system. Because it is difficult to find humans to test on, Algar tested the first "SilverFin serum" on himself. Initially it worked, but later an increased dosage transformed Algar physically, giving him a distorted body that is eel-like. Lord Hellebore subsequently perfected the serum and was able to turn it into a pill. The pill essentially acts as a steroid making anyone who uses it more agile, stronger, etc. for a temporary set of time. Hellebore even tests this pill on his own son (as James had witnessed during the cross-country race). Lord Hellebore reveals that he tested the SilverFin serum on Alfie Kelly, the boy whom Bond is searching for, but Kelly's heart gave out and he died. The wastes poured into Loch Silverfin made the eels vicious. Later Bond is also drugged with the SilverFin serum and locked in a cell. Bond, however, uses his enhanced abilities to escape the cell and the estate by finding an underwater entrance to Loch Silverfin and swimming through, with the help of Wilder Lawless (who kisses him at some point), only to return shortly later with George Hellebore as an ally to destroy Lord Randolph's lab. George has increasingly become upset with his dreadful father and his work, and secretly wishes to be with his mother more than anything. The two destroy the lab and are later confronted by Lord Hellebore who intends to kill them both. Hellebore attacks them with a double-barreled shotgun. However, Algar intervenes at the last moment and forces himself and Hellebore into Loch Silverfin. Algar is wounded by his brother's shotgun and his blood attracts the eels who kill both the brothers while they are fighting.

James collapses due to a lung infection and exhaustion shortly after and for ten days lies unconscious. When he regains consciousness he learns that George has moved back to America to be with his mother, and that his Uncle Max has died, leaving James his car.

Development

Connections to Bond canon
 SilverFin begins with a similar opening to Ian Fleming's Casino Royale.
 Fleming: "The scent and smoke and sweat of a casino are nauseating at three in the morning."
 Higson: "The smell and noise and confusion of a hallway full of schoolboys can be quite awful at twenty past seven in the morning."
 Bond's Aunt Charmian drives an identical Bentley to one Bond drives in Casino Royale and in subsequent books. Bond also inherits his uncle's 1.5 liter Bamford & Martin Sidevalve Short Chassis Tourer. Bamford & Martin later became Aston Martin.
 During a scene at a circus the announcer presents "The Mighty Donovan". "The Mighty O'Donovan" is Donovan "Red" Grant's father, referenced in From Russia, with Love.
 Lord Hellebore tells his son while they are hunting that they are a lot like Indians, and, when his son kills a deer, he says he is a true Indian. This is a reference to Ian Fleming's World War II days, where his soldiers were nicknamed 'Fleming's Indians'. References to American Indians also appear in the novel Casino Royale, where Le Chiffre calls Bond a boy playing Indians, and on the last page, where Bond scolds himself for carelessly playing Indians while his enemies had been working right next to him.

Title
 Higson's original working title was Out of Breath, but it was felt this sounded too much like an Elmore Leonard novel. Several permutations on "Silver" were tried, including "SilverBack", "SilverSkin", "SilverHead", and "SilverFist", before settling on "SilverFin".
 A hellebore is a poisonous plant often thought to resemble a rose, making a suitable name for the handsome but evil Lord Hellebore.

International editions
 When released in Germany in August 2005, SilverFin was retitled Silent Waters Are Deadly.
 The U.S. edition of the book was edited to remove descriptions that were considered too racy for young readers. One such example includes a description of Wilder Lawless's legs during a tussle between herself and Bond.

Publication history

 3 March 2005, Puffin Books, paperback, first British edition
 3 March 2005, Puffin Books, abridged audiobook, first British edition
 Narrated by Charlie Higson.
 2 April 2005, Miramax Books, hardcover, first American edition
 6 October 2005, Puffin Books, hardcover, first British edition
 Limited edition. 1000 copies numbered and signed by Charlie Higson.
 1 April 2006, Miramax Books, paperback, first American edition
 11 April 2006, Listening Library, unabridged audiobook, first American edition
 Narrated by Nathaniel Parker

2011 special editions
On 5 May 2011, Puffin Books released two special editions of SilverFin. First was a numbered, limited edition hardcover with a new introduction by Charlie Higson. It had a glow in the dark cover and came in an engraved Perspex slipcase. All copies were signed by Charlie Higson, and it was limited to 1,000 copies worldwide. Puffin also released a new special edition paperback with "all new material" and a redesigned cover.

In other media

Graphic novel
A graphic novel adaptation of SilverFin written by Charlie Higson and illustrated by artist Kev Walker was released by Puffin Books in the UK on 2 October 2008 and by Disney Hyperion in the U.S. on 18 May 2010.

See also
 Outline of James Bond

References

External links
 Official Young Bond website
 CommanderBond.net interviews Charlie Higson
 The Young Bond Dossier
 MI6.co.uk - Full SilverFin coverage

2005 British novels
Young Bond novels
Eton College
Novels set in Berkshire
Novels set in Scotland
Puffin Books books